Li Jijun (October 9, 1933 – July 21, 2020) was a Chinese geographer and geomorphologist.

Biography
Born in Pengzhou, Sichuan, Li graduated from the Geography Department of Nanjing University in 1956. In 1991, he was elected as a member of the Chinese Academy of Sciences (academician). He was a professor of Geography Department of Lanzhou University and a Dean of the Geography Department of Lanzhou University. Three of his students, Chen Fahu, Qin Dahe and Yao Tandong, were also elected academicians of the Chinese Academy of Sciences.

Honours and awards
 1991 Member of the Chinese Academy of Sciences (CAS)

References

Chinese geographers
Chinese geomorphologists
Nanjing University alumni
Academic staff of Lanzhou University
Members of the Chinese Academy of Sciences
1933 births
2020 deaths
People from Pengzhou
20th-century Chinese scientists
20th-century geographers
21st-century Chinese scientists
21st-century geographers
Scientists from Sichuan